Michael Healey is a Canadian playwright and actor. He graduated from the acting programme at Toronto's Ryerson Theatre School in 1985. His acting credits include the plays of Jason Sherman (The League of Nathans, Reading Hebron and Three in the Back, Two in the Head) and George F. Walker (The End of Civilization, Better Living).

Playwright
Healey trained as an actor at Toronto's Ryerson Theatre School in the mid -eighties. He began writing for the stage in the early nineties and his first play, a solo one-act called Kicked, was produced at the Fringe of Toronto Festival in 1996. He subsequently toured the play across Canada and internationally, and in 1998 it won a Dora Mavor Moore Award (Toronto's theatre awards) as best new play.

The Drawer Boy, his first full-length play, premiered in Toronto in 1999 and won the Dora for best new play, a Chalmers Canadian Playwriting Award, and the Governor General's Literary Award.  It has been produced across North America and internationally, and has been translated into German, French, Japanese and Hindi.

His other plays include The Road to Hell (co-authored with Kate Lynch), Plan B, Rune Arlidge, The Innocent Eye Test, The Nuttals, and Are You Okay. From 2008 to 2012 he created a trilogy of plays about Canadian values and politics, entitled Generous, Courageous and Proud. In all, his plays have won the Dora for best new play five times.

He has also adapted works by Shaw, Checkhov, Molnar, and, most recently, Dürrenmatt. He continues to find work as an actor occasionally.

Actor
Michael Healey has several TV acting credits, including a regular role as lawyer James Ryder on the CBC comedy-drama This Is Wonderland.

Works

Plays
 1996: Kicked
1999: The Road to Hell: Two One-Act Comedies with Kate Lynch, Playwrights Canada Press
1999: The Drawer Boy, Playwrights Canada Press. Winner of the 1999 Governor General's Literary Award for Drama
2002: Plan B., Playwrights Canada Press
2004: Rune Arlidge, Playwrights Canada Press. Shortlisted for the 2004 Governor General's Literary Award for Drama
 2006: The Innocent Eye Test, Playwrights Canada Press
2007: Generous, Scirocco Drama
 2010: Courageous, Playwrights Canada Press. Shortlisted for the 2010 Governor General's Literary Award for Drama
 2011: The Nuttalls, Playwrights Canada Press
 2011: Are you okay? 
2012: Proud, Playwrights Canada Press
 2017: 1979, Playwrights Canada Press. Shortlisted for the 2017 Governor General's Literary Award for Drama
2019: an adaptation of The Front Page to premiere at The Stratford Festival

References

External link

Year of birth missing (living people)
Living people
Governor General's Award-winning dramatists
20th-century Canadian dramatists and playwrights
21st-century Canadian dramatists and playwrights
Canadian male stage actors
Canadian male television actors
Canadian male dramatists and playwrights
20th-century Canadian male writers
21st-century Canadian male writers